Helju Vals (1957-1960 Helju Heuer, pseudonyms Hille Sarem, Krista Varju; 1 March 1929 Tartu – 31 January 2011) was an Estonian language editor, journalist.

In 1953 she graduated from Tartu State University in Estonian philology. After graduating she worked at the editorial board of the newspaper Edasi (later, Postimees). From 1998 until 2003, she was the language advisor of Eesti Meedia.

She was one of the founders of the organizations Eestluse Elujõud, and Estonian Language Protection Association.

Awards
 2003: Wiedemann Language Award
 2005: Order of the White Star, III class.

Works

 Pipart keele peale: väike õpi- ja lustiraamat (2000)
 Ei päevagi kirjareata (2010)

References

1929 births
2011 deaths
Estonian editors
Estonian women journalists
University of Tartu alumni
Writers from Tartu